Lurgan Town Football Club is a Northern Irish, intermediate football club based in Lurgan, County Armagh. The club is currently a member of the Intermediate B Division of the Mid-Ulster Football League and plays at the Lurgan Town Arena.

History
The club was established in 1988. It won Division Two of the Lisburn League in 1996–97, and Division Two of the Mid Ulster League in 2003–04.

The club is one of the biggest in Northern Ireland, fielding no fewer than 18 teams each week in various leagues, from academy level to the senior team.

Before the 2012–13 season, the club's name was Lurgan Town Boys.

References

External links
Club website

Association football clubs in Northern Ireland
Association football clubs established in 1988
Association football clubs in County Armagh
Mid-Ulster Football League clubs
1988 establishments in Northern Ireland
Lurgan